Couldn't Wait to Tell You is the debut record by Los Angeles-based musician Liv.e, released by In Real Life.

Critical reception

Couldn't Wait to Tell You was met with critical acclaim from music critics. On Metacritic, it holds a score of 84/100, indicating "universal acclaim", based on five reviews.

References 

2020 debut albums